Carlos Augusto Ayres de Freitas Britto (born November 18, 1942, in Propriá, Sergipe) is a Brazilian jurist and was a Justice of the Supreme Federal Court of Brazil. He was appointed by President Luiz Inácio Lula da Silva and served from June 25, 2003, to November 16, 2012, when he faced mandatory retirement upon reaching the age of 70.

He was the chief justice of the Supreme Court of Brazil from April 19, 2012, until his retirement.

Bachelor in Law (1966)by the Federal University of Sergipe, institution of which he would become professor, is master (1982) and doctor (1998) by the Pontifical Catholic University of São Paulo, being guided in the doctorate by Celso Ribeiro Bastos.

Despite his quite short term as Chief Justice of Brazil,  he succeeded to conduct many major cases, as well start the trial of the Criminal Action 470 (popularly nicknamed Mensalão), one of the most complex cases in history to be examined by that Court.

He is currently an occasional contributor to O Estado de S. Paulo, a Brazilian newspaper.

References

External links
 Curriculum Vitae

1942 births
Living people
Federal University of Sergipe alumni
Supreme Federal Court of Brazil justices
Academic staff of the Federal University of Sergipe
21st-century Brazilian judges
Election people